Idea Couture, Inc. is a global strategic innovation and experience design firm founded in 2007 and is based in San Francisco and Toronto. The company has additional offices in London, Mexico, Shanghai and São Paulo while operating globally.

Idea Couture works with companies in industries including: consumer products, mobile technologies, healthcare and financial services.  The company has worked with established companies such as Samsung, HTC, FedEx, Pepsi, Aviva, P&G, MIT and Campbells.

The firm employs over 1200 people in a number of disciplines including business strategy, anthropology, behavioral science, data science, communication design, design research, strategic foresight, electrical engineering, healthcare services, brand design, industrial design, interaction design, mechanical engineering, organizational design, and software engineering.

The company was acquired by Cognizant in July 2016.

D-School + B-School
The company has trademarked the term "D-School + B-School" a design thinking methodology for a widely multidisciplinary team combining the capabilities of design schools (D-School) plus business schools (B-School) in its approach. The design side is meant to "humanize" the approach and satisfy the consumers, while the business side derives value and satisfies the companies.

M/I/S/C/ Magazine
M/I/S/C is a magazine on design thinking published by Idea Couture. MISC stands for Movement, Intuition, Structure, Complexity. The content is focused on business through a design lens, navigating the blurred boundaries of business, technology and design. The magazine is released on a seasonal basis. The last issue of the magazine was published in 2018.

References

External links
 Idea Couture official web site
 MISC Magazine official web site

Consulting firms established in 2007